Sintaksis: publitsistika, kritika, polemika, was a journal published in Paris in 1978–2001 with Maria Rozanova as chief editor. A total of 37 issues of the journal were published before the journal was discontinued. According to Rozanova, there are no plans to resume publication. 

The title of the publication references the samizdat poetry almanac Sintaksis edited by Alexander Ginzburg in 1959–1960.

References

External links
 Official online version of the journal 

1978 establishments in France
2001 disestablishments in France
Defunct literary magazines published in France
Magazines established in 1978
Magazines disestablished in 2001
Magazines published in Paris
Russian-language magazines